Dexter Horton (1825 – 1904) was the founder of the first bank in the city of Seattle. Before his founding of the Bank of Dexter Horton in 1870 financial transactions were conducted by merchants.

Dexter Horton was born in 1825 in Seneca Lake, New York. He was raised on a farm his family acquired in the state of Illinois. As a young man he traveled to Oregon with others who were living in his area. Having lived in Oregon for a time he relocated to Seattle. After working as a mill hand for Henry Yesler he opened a general store. This business succeeded. A part of the business was making loans and accepting deposits from customers. In 1870 Dexter Horton opened up the first business dedicated to serving as a bank. It was one of the corporate ancestors of Seattle First National Bank, which eventually merged into the Bank of America.

According to Seattle lore, decades after the battle 1856 Battle of Seattle, Seattle's future fire chief Gardner Kellogg was excavating his house and found a shell from the USS Decatur that had buried itself without exploding. He stuck it under a tree stump that he was trying to burn out and went off to lunch; Dexter Horton stopped by to warm the seat of his pants at the fire, and as it exploded, nearly became the last casualty of the battle of Seattle.

Horton was married to Hannah Eliza Shoudy, sister of John Alden Shoudy, in 1844, and they had three children but two died early. After her death, he married Caroline E. Parsons (d. 1878) on September 29, 1873, and they had one daughter. He then married Arabella C. Agard (1827-1914) on September 14, 1882.

Notes

References 

 HistoryLink Essay: Horton, Dexter (1825–1904)
 HistoryLink Essay: Dexter Horton opens King County's first bank in March 1870.
 
 Dexter Horton Building

1825 births
1904 deaths
Businesspeople from New York (state)
Businesspeople from Seattle
American bankers
19th-century American businesspeople